Gooty Junction railway station (station code: GY) is the primary railway station serving Gooty in Andhra Pradesh, India. The station comes under the jurisdiction of Guntakal division of South Coast Railways.

Structure and amenities 
The station has two platforms.

Gooty railway station is located on the Guntakal–Chennai Egmore section, which is part of Mumbai–Chennai railway route, it is home to one of the five diesel locomotive sheds in the South Coast Railways (SCR). Gooty Junction railway station is situated on the Bangalore – Hyderabad National Highway 7 (India)(old numbering)or 44, Ankola – Bellary – Gooty National Highway NH 63, Gulbarga – Gooty National Highway (In Process w.e.f 23/01/2014). Diesel Loco Shed, Gooty is home to diesel locomotives of the ALCO WDG-2A, WDG-3A, WDM-3A and WDM-3D classes.

Classification 

Gooty railway station is classified as a B–category station in the Guntakal railway division.

References 

Guntakal
Railway junction stations in Andhra Pradesh
Railway stations in Anantapur district